Nestor Simão Kinanga (born 23 September 1988) is an Angolan handball player for Interclube and the Angolan national team.

He participated at the 2017 World Men's Handball Championship.

References

1988 births
Living people
Angolan male handball players